Karolis Petrukonis (born May 18, 1987) is a professional Lithuanian basketball player for PGE Turów of the Polish Basketball League. He plays the power forward and center positions.

College career 
Petrukonis played for the Clemson Tigers men's basketball team from 2006 to 2010.

International career 
Petrukonis represented Lithuanian youth national basketball teams multiple times from 2003 to 2007.

References 

1987 births
Living people
Centers (basketball)
Clemson Tigers men's basketball players
Korvpalli Meistriliiga players
Lithuanian expatriate basketball people in the United States
Lithuanian men's basketball players
Power forwards (basketball)
Sportspeople from Trakai
University of Tartu basketball team players
Lithuanian expatriate basketball people in Estonia